Big Dummy Lake is a lake in Barron County, Wisconsin, in the United States.It has a maximum depth of 54 feet.

The  lake may be used for recreational boating and fishing.

See also
List of lakes in Wisconsin

References

Lakes of Barron County, Wisconsin